Samantha Harris (born 1973) is an American TV presenter.

Samantha Harris may also refer to:

 Samantha Harris (model) (born 1990), Australian fashion model
 Samantha Harris, fictional character in the film Comedown

See also
 Sam Harris (disambiguation)